Stojan Plešinac is a Slovenian football coach and former player.

He played for Slovenian clubs NK Olimpija, ND Gorica, NK Ljubljana and NK Korotan and was Slovenian league top-scorer with Ljubljana in 1988/89. He later managed NK Ljubljana in Slovenian First League and even played some matches for the club, when it was expelled to Slovenian Fifth League in 2005/06 and 2006/07 seasons.

External links
 Stats from Slovenia at PrvaLiga.

Slovenian footballers
Slovenian football managers
Yugoslav footballers
NK Svoboda Ljubljana players
NK Ljubljana players
NK Ljubljana managers
1960 births
Living people
NK Olimpija Ljubljana (1945–2005) players
People from Postojna
Association football midfielders